The canton of Solothurn or canton of Soleure is a canton of Switzerland. It is located in the northwest of Switzerland. The capital is Solothurn.

History

The foundation of the village of Salodurum took place in the time of the Roman emperor Tiberius. The territory of the canton comprises land acquired by the former town, mainly in the Middle Ages. For that reason the shape of the canton is irregular and includes two exclaves along the French border, separated from the rest of the canton by Basel-Land, which form separate districts of the canton. In 1481, the canton became a member of the military alliance of the former Swiss confederation. At the end of the Reformation, Solothurn maintained its Catholic religion.  Between 1798 and 1803 the canton was part of the Helvetic Republic. In 1803 Solothurn was one of the 19 Swiss cantons that were reconstituted by Napoleon (Mediation). In 1830, the population rebelled against the aristocratic regime and the canton became definitely liberal-democratic. Even though the population was strictly Roman Catholic, Solothurn did not join the Catholic separatist movement (Sonderbund) in 1845–7. Similarly, the federal constitutions of 1848 and 1874 were approved. The current constitution of the canton dates from 1987.

Geography
The canton is located in the north-west of Switzerland. To the west and south lie the cantons of Jura and Bern, to the east is Aargau. To the north the canton is bounded by the canton of Basel-Landschaft. Parts of two of the districts are exclaves and are located along the border of France (Grand Est). The lands are drained by the Aare river and its tributaries. The landscape is mostly flat, but it includes the foothills of the Jura massif. Part of this, the massif of the Weissenstein, overlooks Solothurn and the Mittelland from the north and has views of the Bernese Alps. The flat lands are a plain created by the Aare river. The total area of the canton is 791 km².

Political subdivisions

Districts 

From 2005, Solothurn's ten districts are merged pairwise into five electoral districts, termed Amtei. From 2005, the districts have only a statistical significance.
 Bucheggberg, Amtei Wasseramt-Bucheggberg
 Dorneck, Amtei Dorneck-Thierstein (unofficially Schwarzbubenland)
 Gäu, Amtei Thal-Gäu
 Gösgen, Amtei Olten-Gösgen (unofficially Niederamt)
 Lebern, Amtei Solothurn-Lebern
 Olten, Amtei Olten-Gösgen
 Solothurn, Amtei Solothurn-Lebern
 Thal, Amtei Thal-Gäu
 Thierstein, Amtei Dorneck-Thierstein
 Wasseramt, Amtei Wasseramt-Bucheggberg

Municipalities

There are 125 municipalities in the canton.

Demographics

The population is mostly German-speaking. About 44% of the population are Roman Catholic, with most of the remainder being Protestants (31% ). , the population included 46,898 foreigners, or about 18.7% of the total population.

Historical population 
The historical population is given in the following table:

Economy
Up to the 19th century agriculture was the main economic activity in the canton. Agriculture is still of importance, but manufacturing and the service industry are now more significant. The industries of the canton are specialized in watches, jewellery, textiles, paper, cement and auto parts. Until recently the manufacturing of shoes was an important economic activity, but global competition thought that the Swiss canton was not competitive enough.

The canton is home to the Gösgen Nuclear Power Plant near Däniken which started operation in 1979.

Politics

Federal election results

 FDP before 2009, FDP.The Liberals after 2009
 "*" indicates that the party was not on the ballot in this canton.

Transport
The canton has good connections with other parts of Switzerland, both by rail and by road. There is a railway junction at Olten with direct trains to Geneva, Zurich, Basel and the Ticino via Lucerne.

Notes and references

External links

Official site 
Official statistics

 
Cantons of Switzerland
Cantons of the Helvetic Republic